Frederick Green may refer to:

Frederick Green (footballer) (1851–1928), English footballer 
Frederick W. Green (congressman) (1816–1879), U.S. Representative from Ohio
Freddie Green (1911–1987), American swing jazz guitarist
Freddie Green (footballer) (1916–1998), English football full back
Frederick Ernest Green (1867–1922), British political activist and farmer
Frederick Thomas Green (1829–1876), explored Africa
Frederick W. Green (Egyptologist) (1869–1949), English Egyptologist

See also
Fred Green (disambiguation)